The Anáhuac Cancún University belongs to the Anahuac University Network, affiliated with  the Anahuac University Network (RUA), the international education system of the Legion of Christ, in 18 countries and serving over 100,000 students from kindergarten to graduate school.

The university's program is coordinated with those of European universities. It has foreign students, both under curricula or by an abroad program

Name
"Anáhuac" means “near the water”. The name passed on to the whole network because of the location of the first university in the network, the '"Anáhuac México Norte University" located in the area of Lomas Anáhuac in Interlomas in Mexico City. Symbolically, the name refers to "the lake region that gave central place at the Aztec capital: Tenochtitlán, Central America's most populous and largest cultural development, where the Mexico City now stands and in it, the university".

Motto
“Vince In Bono Malum”, or "Defeat Evil with Good".

Athletics
The school has an American football team, the Leones Anáhuac Cancún, which has competed in ONEFA since 2007. They have won two conference titles in 2009 and 2019.

References

External links
University website
University official page on Facebook
University official page on Twitter

 
Private universities and colleges in Mexico
Universities and colleges in Quintana Roo
Regnum Christi
Legion of Christ
Anahuac universities
Universidad
Educational institutions established in 2000
2000 establishments in Mexico